Arsug is a rural locality (a selo) in Burshagsky Selsoviet, Agulsky District, Republic of Dagestan, Russia. The population was 238 as of 2010.

Geography 
Arsug is located on the Koshanapu River, 24 km northeast of Tpig (the district's administrative centre) by road. Khudig is the nearest rural locality.

References 

Rural localities in Agulsky District